DreadOut is a survival horror video game from independent developer Digital Happiness for Microsoft Windows, Linux, and OS X. A port for PlayStation 4 was announced but never released. The story is about a group of high school students in Indonesia who come across an old abandoned town. There they are confronted with ghosts and paranormal activities, and one of the students, the protagonist Linda, begins to uncover the secrets of the town and its surrounding area. A sequel, titled DreadOut 2, released for Microsoft Windows in February 2020 and was subsequently ported to PlayStation 4, PlayStation 5, Xbox One, and Xbox Series X/S in July 2022.

Gameplay
DreadOut is a third-person horror game that uses mechanics similar to those found in the Fatal Frame series. The player uses modern gadgets, such as her smartphone and a digital camera, to interact with (or fend off) various kinds of Indonesian mythical ghosts and to help her solve various puzzles. When Linda dies in the game, she awakens in Limbo, depicted as darkness surrounded by candles with a bright light in the distance. By running towards the light, Linda will come back to life. However, subsequent deaths will push the light further and further away from Linda, unless she manages to find three mystical items to keep the light closer to her.

The game features both third and first-person control schemes, with the player navigating environments with a standard over-the-shoulder perspective. If the player decides to use their digital camera to photograph something, they enter a first-person perspective to see through Linda's equipped camera. Any ghosts that are photographed or interacted with in any way will be recorded in a "Ghostpedia" in Linda's notebook. Linda can also find articles and journal entries that describe much of the game's backstory. A preview video showed a tablet version of the game, where the player controls Linda via the touch screen.

Plot
When a group of senior high school students go astray from their vacation trip in Indonesia, they discover an old deserted town. They soon realize that something sinister is about to happen. Linda Meilinda realises something mystical is happening to her. She gains a spiritual power that could save her and her friends from the unknown.

Development

Indonesian developer Digital Happiness worked on the game using a team of around 20 people. After releasing a demo, they sought a crowd sourcing campaign via Indiegogo. The campaign asked for US$25,000 and ended with US$29,067. They needed crowd sourcing since the game industry in Indonesia is small and focuses mostly on social or mobile games and were unable to find funding. Digital Happiness founder Rachmad Imron stated: "We have a lot of good human resources but most of them went abroad because there's no game industry in Indonesia, but we hope this will change soon."

Reception

DreadOut received "mixed or average" reviews, according to review aggregator Metacritic.

Film adaptation 
In 2018, Indonesian production company GoodHouse announced a film adaption of Dreadout. The film was released in Indonesia on 3 January 2019. The film is directed by Kimo Stamboel. The film cast included Caitlin Halderman, Jefri Nichol, Marsha Aruan, Ciccio Manassero, Susan Sameh, and Irsyadillah.

References

External links
 

2014 video games
Abandoned buildings and structures in fiction
Fiction about photography
Video games about curses
Episodic video games
Video games about exorcism
Video games about ghosts
Indie video games
Indiegogo projects
Linux games
MacOS games
Psychological horror games
Single-player video games
Steam Greenlight games
Video games based on mythology
Video games developed in Indonesia
Video games featuring female protagonists
Video games set in Indonesia
Windows games
Limbo
Video games with alternate endings